St. Mary's Catholic Church is a historic Catholic church building in the city of Massillon, Ohio, United States.  Constructed in 1876 for a congregation composed largely of European immigrants, it has been named a historic site. The parish remains an active part of the Roman Catholic Diocese of Youngstown.

History 
The origins of St. Mary parish lie among numerous Germans and Irish who settled in Massillon in its early years and built a small house of worship on Cherry Road in the 1840s.  This building stood until 1875, when it was destroyed so that the present church might occupy its location; it was built in 1876.  The designer was Leon Beaver, a Dayton architect.  He was assisted in design and in stonecarving by Massillon resident John Verment, who later designed St. Joseph's Catholic Church elsewhere in Massillon.<ref>Knapp, Amy.  "Architect Left Mark on Massillon, Historic Church.  The Independent, 2010-07-18.  Accessed 2015-01-02.</ref>

 Structure 
Built primarily of sandstone, St. Mary's is a high Gothic Revival structure with a facade of two nearly identical towers and a Latin cross floor plan. Sculptures are placed in small alcoves on the second stories of the towers and at the peak of the front gable, while windows and belfries occupy the higher stories of the towers. The main entrance comprises three adjacent portals underneath a large rose window at the center of the facade. Both the buttresses and the corners of the towers rise to decorative finials, while a large cross crowns the front gable.

 National shrine of St. Dymphna 
In addition to its usual functions as a parish church, St. Mary's houses a shrine to St. Dymphna, a medieval Irish virgin martyr, although the shrine needed a complete reconstruction after being destroyed in a 2015 fire.  The church was listed on the National Register of Historic Places in early 1979, qualifying because of its historically significant architecture.  It is one of four Massillon churches with this designation, along with First Methodist Church, John Verment's St. Joseph's Catholic Church, and St. Timothy's Episcopal Church.

 2015 fire and repairs 
In 4 August 2015, a fire destroyed the chapel that contained the Shrine of St Dymphna within St. Mary's Catholic Church, as well as the parish's baptistry. The fire may have been caused by a woman who was given permission by the priest to stay after Mass and take photographs of the church. Following the fire, the neighboring St. Paul's Lutheran Church held a prayer service, which was officiated by the clergymen of St. Mary's Catholic Church and St. Paul's Lutheran Church. The same St. Paul's Lutheran Church offered its church to the congregation of St. Mary's Catholic Church while the latter community's church building was being repaired. The Catholic Exponent'', the official publication of the Roman Catholic Diocese of Youngstown commented on the situation, stating that:

References

External links

St. Mary's Catholic Church
National Shrine of St. Dymphna

Roman Catholic churches completed in 1876
Churches in Massillon, Ohio
Churches in the Roman Catholic Diocese of Youngstown
German-American culture in Ohio
Gothic Revival church buildings in Ohio
Irish-American culture in Ohio
National Register of Historic Places in Stark County, Ohio
Sandstone churches in the United States
19th-century Roman Catholic church buildings in the United States